Vickie D. McDonald (born May 26, 1947)  was Nebraska state senator from St. Paul, Nebraska in the Nebraska Legislature and account executive. 

Personal life
She was born on May 26, 1947, in Phillips, Nebraska and graduated from Phillips High School.  She was a 1990 Dale Carnegie graduate, 1996 Nebraska LEAD Program graduate, 1997 Life Underwriters Training Council graduate, 1999 Hall County Leadership Tomorrow graduate and a 2002 Bowhay Institute for Legislative Leadership Development graduate. She then worked in many financial services occupations and currently sits on many Grand Island, Nebraska organizations. After the death of her husband Richard N. McDonald, she married Larry Harnisch. They live in Lincoln, Nebraska.

State legislature

She was appointed to the legislature on August 10, 2001 to replace her husband, deceased senator Richard N. McDonald.   She was then elected in 2002 to represent the 41st Nebraska legislative district and reelected in 2004.  She sat on the Education, Natural Resources, Executive Board, Reference, Legislative Performance Audit committees and is the vice chairperson of the Intergovernmental Cooperation committee.

Drug policy

Salvia divinorum
Senator Vickie McDonald supported a proposal for the addition of the psychoactive herb Salvia divinorum to Nebraska's Schedule I classification early in 2008. Salvia divinorum is currently legal in that state, but Senator McDonald has said - "Nebraska needs to classify salvia divinorum and its active ingredient, salvinorin A, as a controlled substance in order to protect our children from a drug being portrayed as harmless when it's not." [...] "Videos of teens using this common plant to get high have become an internet sensation" [...] "Anytime anything's on YouTube it's an issue," [...] "Legislators, parents, grandparents, we need to be on top of these things," [...] "We need to protect our children and this is one way we can do it."

Her bill proposes addition of Salvia divinorum to Schedule I of the Nebraska Uniform Controlled Substances Act. Possessing Salvia would be considered a Class IV felony with a penalty of up to five years.  Trafficking would fall under a Class III felony with up to a 20-year penalty.

Opponents of extremely prohibitive Salvia restrictions argue that such reactions are largely due to an inherent prejudice and a particular cultural bias rather than any actual balance of evidence, pointing out inconsistencies in attitudes toward other more toxic and addictive drugs such as alcohol and nicotine.[i] While not objecting to some form of regulatory legal control, in particular with regard to the sale to minors or sale of enhanced high-strength extracts, most Salvia proponents otherwise argue against stricter legislation.[ii]

Tobacco and alcohol
Senator Vickie McDonald's second highest political campaign contributions from industry groups in 2006 came from "Beer, Wine & Liquor" related industries. Her third highest campaign contributors in 2006 came from industries related to "Tobacco companies & tobacco product sales".

See also
Nebraska Legislature
Legal status of Salvia divinorum (Nebraska)

Notes
^ The worldwide number of alcohol-related deaths is calculated at over 2,000 people per day, in the US the number is over 300 deaths per day.
^ Those advocating consideration of Salvia divinorum's potential for beneficial use in a modern context argue that more could be learned from Mazatec culture, where Salvia is not really associated with notions of drug taking at all and it is rather considered as a spiritual sacrament. In light of this it is argued that Salvia divinorum could be better understood more positively as an entheogen rather than pejoratively as a hallucinogen.

Citations

References

 - Table 2. Global burden of disease and injury attributable to selected risk factors, 1990.

News references

General references

1947 births
Living people
People from Hamilton County, Nebraska
People from St. Paul, Nebraska
Nebraska state senators
Women state legislators in Nebraska
People from Grand Island, Nebraska
21st-century American women